Tony Timpone is the former longtime editor of Fangoria magazine, as well as an author about the horror genre, a film festival programmer, and a producer/interviewer for horror-related TV and radio shows.

Early life
Tony Timpone was born in New York City, raised in Queens, and graduated from New York University in 1985. He wrote for the university's two student newspapers, The Courier and Washington Square News, and majored in journalism. As a child, he had read the influential Famous Monsters of Filmland magazine, and said he "always wanted to write for a magazine like that." 

In high school, he had been president of a science-fiction club. He attended science-fiction conventions, where he would interview genre stars. Selling his freelance interviews, he launched his journalism career. He wanted to write for Fangoria, but it was not accepting freelance articles at the time:

Career

Fangoria
Tony Timpone began working with Fangoria magazine in 1985 and continued there until February 2010, when he was succeeded by Chris Alexander. He said of getting the job, starting under editor David McDonnell, that:

{{quote|I first joined the Fangoria staff in July of 1985. It was my first job out of college, although I had been freelancing to Fango'''s sister publication Starlog during my last year at college. I began as an Editorial Assistant to then-Editor David Everitt, who decided to move on a month after I started. Since I was fresh out of college and this was my first job in publishing, I was a little too green to take over the job myself. So I served as the Managing Editor to Dave McDonnell, who took over as Editor until I got my wings. The following year, I was promoted to Editor in Chief.}}

In the early 1990s, Timpone was a consultant on three Fangoria movies for Columbia TriStar Home Video: Mindwarp (1991), Children of the Night (1991), and Severed Ties (1992). In the early to mid-2000s, he served as an acquisitions chief for Fangoria 's various video labels. In addition, he was a producer/interviewer for Fangoria TV’s Screamography, a recurring guest on the since-defunct Sirius Satellite Radio show Fangoria Radio with host Dee Snider and co-host Debbie Rochon, for four years beginning in 2006, and the co-producer/programming producer/moderator of Fangorias Weekend of Horrors conventions from 1986 to 2009, and again beginning 2021

After leaving his editor-in-chief position in 2010, Timpone began running Fangoria'''s video-on-demand and DVD divisions.

Timpone also edited Fangorias sister publication Gorezone, which lasted from 1989 to 1993.

Other work
Since 1993, Timpone has helped program international horror/fantasy festivals in Milan, Italy and Montreal, Quebec, Canada. Before its closing, Timpone programmed and hosted The Two Boots Pioneer Theater's monthly "Monster Mondays" film series.

Under the name Anthony Timpone, he authored the 1996 St. Martin's Press book Men, Makeup, and Monsters: Hollywood's Masters of Illusion and FX.

In late 2004, he served as a producer on Bravo’s five-hour documentary series The 100 Scariest Movie Moments: "Kaufman Films needed a 'horror guy' to get them connected with the folks in the horror industry. So I came on board and tracked down and interviewed most of the scream greats for the series."

He was programming director and moderator for the horror conventions Monsterpalooza and Son of Monsterpalooza in at least 2016 and 2017. Since 1998, he has been the co-director of international programming for Montreal, Canada's Fantasia Film Festival.

Filmography

References

External links
Anthony Timpone at the Internet Movie Database

American magazine editors
American male journalists
Living people
Year of birth missing (living people)
Place of birth missing (living people)
Fangoria